Something in the Air is a 2012 French drama film written and directed by Olivier Assayas. The film was selected to compete for the Golden Lion at the 69th Venice International Film Festival, where Assayas won the Best Screenplay Award.

Plot
In 1971, French student Gilles gets entangled in contemporary political turmoils although he would rather just be a creative artist. While torn between his solidarity to his friends and his personal ambitions he falls in love with Christine.

Cast
 Clément Métayer as Gilles
 Lola Créton as Christine
 Félix Armand as Alain
 Carole Combes as Laure
 India Menuez as Leslie
 Hugo Conzelmann as Jean-Pierre
 Martin Loizillon as Rackam le Rouge
 André Marcon as Gilles' Father

References

External links
 
 
 

2012 films
2012 drama films
French drama films
Films directed by Olivier Assayas
Films set in 1971
Films set in France
Films set in Italy
Films shot in Paris
Georges Delerue Award winners
Films with screenplays by Olivier Assayas
2010s French films